Antonio Sastre (27 April 1911 – 23 November 1987) was an Argentine footballer who played most of his career for Club Atlético Independiente and São Paulo of Brazil. He is one of the 24 players inducted into the Argentine Football Association Hall of Fame. Sastre was an all-round midfielder who could play well almost anywhere on the pitch due to his intelligence and versatility.

Sastre is also known as one of the first true playmakers of the pre-war era as well as one of the best. Sastre won 11 titles at club level, and 2 international championships with the Argentina national team.

Club career

Sastre began his football career at Progresista, being traded to Independiente in 1931. With the coming of forwards Vicente de la Mata and Arsenio Erico, Independiente built a powerful formation that would win the 1938, 1939 league titles plus domestic cups Ibarguren, A. Escobar and international Copa Aldao twice.

During his 12 seasons with the club he played 340 games, scoring 112 goals.  In 1942 Sastre joined Brazilian side Sao Paulo which last title had been won in 1931. Playing for Sao Paulo, Sastre won three Paulista championships in 1943, 1945 and 1946.

“Cuando llegué a San Pablo –recordaba Sastre– no me pude adaptar rápido. La prensa decía que el equipo había comprado un bondi, que es como ellos le llaman a los tranvías viejos, a los fierros oxidados. Los primeros dos partidos los perdimos y se fue el técnico. Ahí vino Lloreca, y como yo no estaba acostumbrado a entrenar todos los días ni a concentrar antes de jugar, le fui a hablar y me dejó ir directamente los domingos a la cancha, antes del almuerzo. En el primer partido que jugamos con él, contra Portuguesa, ganamos 9–1 y yo metí seis goles”.

Sastre returned to Argentina in 1947 when he helped Gimnasia y Esgrima de La Plata win the Segunda División championship and gain promotion to the first division that same year.

International career
Sastre played for the Argentina national team on 34 occasions, scoring 6 goals. He won Copa América with Argentina on two occasions, in 1937 and 1941.

Honours

Club
Independiente
 Primera División (2): 1938, 1939
 Copa Ibarguren (2): 1938, 1939
 Copa Adrián Escobar (1): 1939
 Copa Aldao (2): 1938, 1939

Sao Paulo
 Campeonato Paulista (3): 1943, 1945, 1946

Gimnasia y Esgrima LP
 Primera B Metropolitana (1): 1947

International
Argentina
 Copa América (2): 1937, 1941

References

1911 births
1987 deaths
People from Lomas de Zamora
Association football midfielders
Argentine footballers
Argentina international footballers
Argentine expatriate footballers
Club Atlético Independiente footballers
São Paulo FC players
Club de Gimnasia y Esgrima La Plata footballers
Argentine Primera División players
Expatriate footballers in Brazil
Argentine expatriate sportspeople in Brazil
Copa América-winning players
Sportspeople from Buenos Aires Province